Jack Lohman (born 23 May 1958) CBE, born Jacek Lohman, is an internationally recognised leader in the development of museums and cultural policy. He has worked with governments in Africa, Europe, the Middle East and North America on issues of cultural diplomacy, repatriation and human remain in museums. He has received numerous awards including the Bene Merito from the Government of Poland and CBE from HM the Queen.

Jack Lohman was the chief executive of the Royal British Columbia Museum Canada until he resigned in February 2021 during an investigation into the museum repatriation and reconciliation efforts. He was President of the Canadian Museum Association, is a member of the Board of the Adam Mickiewicz Institute and the City of Warsaw Museum. He is also a board member of the British Columbia Achievement Foundation

Early life and education
Jack Lohman was born and grew up in London, to which his parents had immigrated from Poland. He attended the University of East Anglia in Norwich, from which he graduated in 1979 with an honours degree in art history. He was awarded scholarships to study architecture at the University of Warsaw and the Freie Universität Berlin in 1981, receiving from the latter a master's degree in architecture. In 2008, he received an honorary doctorate from the University of Westminster, followed by one in 2009 from the Polish University Abroad in London and in 2012 from his alma mater, the University of East Anglia.

Museums
In 1999, Lohman was selected to be the chief executive of Iziko Museums of Cape Town, South Africa, an organization consisting of fifteen national museums including the Iziko Museums and the South African National Gallery.

Lohman returned in London in 2002 to become director of Museum of London, where in 2004 he opened the Museum of London Docklands and from 2002 to 2008 also chairman of the International Council of Museums UK. From 2008 to 2013, Lohman was chairman of the National Museum in Warsaw. He has also served on the board of the Second World War Museum in Gdańsk, Poland and is a former member of the UK National Commission's to UNESCO’s Culture Committee.

In 2012 Lohman left the Museum of London, heading to Victoria, British Columbia to become CEO of the Royal British Columbia Museum, a post he held until 2021. In 2014, he was appointed to the executive board of the Canadian Commission for UNESCO and in 2017 was elected vice president of the Canadian Museums Association

Since 1997, Lohman has been a professor of Museum Design and Communication at the Bergen Academy of Art and Design in Bergen, Norway. He was chief editor of UNESCO's publications series "Museums and Diversity" and is a senior editor of Berghahn Journals’ "Museum Worlds". He has written a number of books including "Museums at the Crossroads?" (2014) and "Treasures of the Royal BC Museum and Archives" (2015). Lohman has received state honours from Colombia and Rwanda, in 2011 was awarded Poland's Bene Merito honorary badge and in the 2012 Queen's Birthday Honours was inducted into the Order of the British Empire. He lives in Warsaw, Poland.

Book collector
Lohman is an avid reader and has over the years assembled a personal library of approximately 30,000 books. In 2012, when he moved to Victoria to take his new position as CEO of the Royal British Columbia Museum, he spent nearly $4,000 to move about a third of his collection with him, the other 20,000 volumes remaining at his family home in Wimbledon. In June of that year, a student at Montreal's McGill University was assigned to create an inventory of the British Columbia portion of his library, while a niece was assigned to inventory his collection of books in London. 
 
Lohman is a polyglot who besides English speaks Polish, German, French, Spanish, Portuguese and Japanese and thus his library too spans multiple languages. As of 2016, he was learning Ancient Greek in order to read the classics in their original forms.

References

1958 births
Living people
English people of Polish descent
Alumni of the University of East Anglia
Alumni of the University of Manchester
Commanders of the Order of the British Empire
Directors of the Museum of London
British curators
Canadian curators
English architectural historians
English male non-fiction writers